Michael Farrell (1899–1962) was an Irish writer and broadcaster remembered for his posthumous novel Thy Tears Might Cease. He was born in Carlow town to a prosperous Catholic shopkeeper, and educated at Knockbeg College and Blackrock College. He spent time in Mountjoy Prison during the Irish War of Independence and left Trinity College Dublin without graduating. His brother, Sean O'Farrell, was the commanding officer of the Carlow Brigade of the Irish Republican Army from the brigade's formation until September 1920.

After his time in university, he worked for several years in the Belgian Congo as a Marine Superintendent of Customs, returning to Ireland after managing to sell a ship for a handsome profit. He worked for Radio Éireann and as a journalist. In 1930 he married businesswoman Frances Cautley Baker, divorced daughter of painter Frances Baker, with whom she ran a textile company in Blackrock, Dublin called the Crock of Gold. The Crock manufactured wool products, with Frances designing patterns and primarily selling wholesale to fashion houses. 

The couple settled in Kilmacanogue. In 1934 Farrell wrote, produced, and directed the silent film Some Say Chance, notable as the screen debut of Maureen O'Hara; Frances did set design and location scouting. Farrell's magnum opus, Thy Tears Might Cease,  is a novel set in the Irish revolutionary period. Although the first draft was completed in 1937, it was published only posthumously in 1963, after editing by Monk Gibbon. He contributed as "Gulliver" to The Bell. Latterly he worked mainly in his wife's business.

References

Sources
 
 
 '

Citations

1899 births
1962 deaths
20th-century Irish journalists
20th-century Irish novelists
20th-century Irish screenwriters
Alumni of Trinity College Dublin
Irish broadcasters
Irish film directors
Irish film producers
Irish journalists
Irish male novelists
Irish screenwriters
People from County Carlow
People from County Wicklow
People educated at Blackrock College
People of the Irish War of Independence
Silent film directors